George Hyer (July 16, 1819 – April 20, 1872) was a member of the Wisconsin State Senate and the Wisconsin State Assembly. Hyer was elected to the Senate in 1850 and to the Assembly in 1863.

Biography
Hyer was born on July 16, 1819, in Fort Covington, New York. Hyer married Catherine Keyes. They had a son before her death in 1863. In 1867, Hyer married R. H. Fernandez. Hyer died on April 20, 1872, and was buried at Forest Hill Cemetery.

References

People from Fort Covington, New York
Members of the Wisconsin State Assembly
Wisconsin state senators
1819 births
1872 deaths
Burials in Wisconsin
19th-century American politicians